Enrique Anjel Marmentini Gil (15 July 1922 – 25 December 1996) was a Chilean basketball player. He competed in the men's tournament at the 1948 Summer Olympics.

References

External links

1922 births
1996 deaths
Chilean men's basketball players
Olympic basketball players of Chile
Basketball players at the 1948 Summer Olympics
1950 FIBA World Championship players